Wide Open is the tenth studio album by American musician Michael McDonald, released on September 15, 2017 by Chonin Records and BMG. Shannon Forrest and McDonald produced the album. Wide Open is McDonald's first album of original material in 17 years since Blue Obsession (2000).

Background
In an interview with Billboard, McDonald said many of the songs on Wide Open have to do with sobriety: "I realized that a lot of the songs, I put them in different context, storyline wise, but if they’re about anything, they’re about my coming to terms with my living out in the open and learning to live without substances to fill the hole, without self-medicating."

Critical reception

AllMusic senior editor Stephen Thomas Erlewine found that while McDonald "happily trades on the slow-burning R&B grooves and soft rock melodicism that made him a star in the '70s and '80s, there's not much of a feeling of pandering nostalgia here. Instead, McDonald seems to be integrating all his personas – the soul true believer, the godfather of smooth – in a record that not only feels true but, song for song, is sturdier than nearly all of the albums he recorded at his popular peak."

Track listing
All tracks produced by Michael McDonald and Shannon Forrest.

Personnel

 Michael McDonald – lead and backing vocals, Wurlitzer organ (1, 4, 9, 10), electric guitar (1), horn arrangements (1), acoustic piano (2, 8, 9), Rhodes piano (3, 7), harmonica (4), Wurlitzer electric piano (5), keyboards (6), acoustic guitar (6, 8, 10), additional synth pads and brass pad (7), clavinet (7, 9), synthesizers (8), string arrangements (8)
 Larry Goldings – Hammond B3 organ (1, 3, 8, 12)
 Tim Akers – synthesizers (3)
 Jeff Roach – synthesizers (4, 10)
 David Paich – synthesizers (5), Hammond B3 organ (5, 9, 10, 11)
 John Peppard – synth sequencing (7), original arrangements (7)
 Steve Porcaro – synthesizers (7), synth effects (7) 
 Mike Rojas – Rhodes piano (12)
 Andrew Ramsey – electric guitar (1)
 Warren Haynes – electric guitar (2)
 Robben Ford – electric guitar solo (2)
 Michael Landau – electric guitar (3, 7, 9, 11, 12), slide guitar (4), guitar solo outro (4), guitar solo (5), electric guitar fills (10)
 Dann Huff – electric guitar (4, 8), acoustic guitar (4, 8), guitar solo (4)
 Sol Littlefield – additional electric guitar (4), electric guitar solo (10)
 Bernie Chiaravalle – 12-string guitar (4), acoustic guitar (5)
 David Levita – electric guitar (5, 8, 10), additional guitar (7), acoustic guitar (11), additional electric guitar (11), rhythm electric guitar (12), "robot" guitar solo (12)
 Ilya Toshinski – acoustic guitar (6), banjo (6), mandolin (6), additional guitar (8)
 Danny Rader – acoustic guitar (10), bouzouki (10)
 Craig Young – bass (1, 10)
 Willie Weeks – bass (2)
 Marcus Miller – bass (3, 9)
 Lance Morrison – bass (4)
 Tony Lucido – bass (5)
 Tommy Sims – bass (7, 11)
 Leland Sklar – bass (8)
 Michael Rhodes – bass (12)
 Shannon Forrest – drums (1-12), percussion (1, 3-7, 9-12), drum programming (3, 4, 6, 7, 8), brushes (6), synth bass (6), synthesizer (6), string arrangements (6), drum loops (10)
 Mark Douthit – sax solo (1), saxophone (2, 11), additional horn arrangements (2), sax arrangement (11)
 Ward Smith – tenor saxophone (2)
 Tom Scott – sax solo (3, 12)
 Branford Marsalis – soprano saxophone (7)
 Scott Mayo – alto and tenor saxophones (9, 12)
 George Shelby – baritone and tenor saxophones (9, 12)
 Matt Perrine – sousaphone (2)
 Barry Green – trombone (2)
 Mark Mullins – trombone (2), horn arrangements (2)
 Andrew Lippman – trombone (9, 12) 
 Bobby Campo – trumpet (2)
 Steve Patrick – trumpet (2)
 Michael Leonhart – trumpet (3), flugelhorn (3), horn arrangements (3)
 Harry Kim – trumpet (9, 12)
 David Frank – horn arrangements (9, 12)
 Matt McCauley – string arrangements and conductor (2)
 The Kris Wilkinson Strings – strings (2)
 Amy Holland – guest vocals (1)
 Drea Rheneé – guest vocals (9)

Production 
 Producers – Michael McDonald and Shannon Forrest
 Production Assistant – Kathy Walker
 Recorded and Mixed by Shannon Forrest
 Additional Engineers – Jarad Clement, Jasper LeMaster, Grady Walker and Nathan Yarborough.
 Mastered by Bob Ludwig at Gateway Mastering (Portland, ME).
 Art Direction and Package – Jordan Fann, Joel Hoffner and Jon Romero.

Charts

References

External links
 

2017 albums
Michael McDonald (musician) albums
BMG Rights Management albums